Dmitry Matveevich Ukolov (October 23, 1929 – November 25, 1992) was a Russian ice hockey player who played in the Soviet Hockey League.

He was born in Moscow, Soviet Union.

Ukolov played for HC CSKA Moscow and was inducted into the Russian and Soviet Hockey Hall of Fame in 1954.

External links

 Russian and Soviet Hockey Hall of Fame bio

1929 births
1992 deaths
HC CSKA Moscow players
HC Spartak Moscow players
Ice hockey players at the 1956 Winter Olympics
Olympic ice hockey players of the Soviet Union
Olympic gold medalists for the Soviet Union
Ice hockey people from Moscow
Olympic medalists in ice hockey
Medalists at the 1956 Winter Olympics
Russian ice hockey players